Christopher Bower Gaze,  (born 12 May 1952) is an English actor, host, artist, theatre and opera director residing in Vancouver, British Columbia, Canada.

History
Born in Guildford, Surrey, England, he trained at the Bristol Old Vic Theatre School before coming to Canada in 1975 where he spent three seasons at the Shaw Festival.

Career
He moved to Vancouver in 1983 and in 1990 founded Bard on the Beach which in 2014 achieved attendance exceeding 100,000. In addition to performing and directing for Bard, Christopher's voice is heard regularly in cartoon series, commercials and on the radio. He also hosts Vancouver Symphony's popular Tea and Trumpets series and their annual Christmas concerts. His many honours include induction into the BC Entertainment Hall of Fame, Canada's Meritorious Service Medal (2004), Honorary Doctorates from UBC & SFU, the BC Community Achievement Award (2007), the Gold Medallion from the Children's Theatre Foundation of America (2007) and a Jessie Award for Best Supporting Actor for his performance in Equus at The Playhouse. As an Olympic ambassador, Christopher was honoured to run with the Olympic flame for the 2010 Games. A public speaker with the National Speakers Bureau, Christopher frequently shares his insights on Shakespeare and theatre with students, service organizations and businesses.

He narrated the Season 3 of Emmy Award-winning animation series Madeline (after Christopher Plummer stepped down).

Additionally, he has also performed voiceover roles for animation, most notably as Turaga Vakama in the first three Bionicle movies, as well as Diagnostic Drone in Beast Machines and Major Mint in Barbie in the Nutcracker.

Christopher was awarded the Order of British Columbia (OBC) announced on 18 May 2012 by the Premier of British Columbia and the Civil Meritorious Service Medal (MSM) (Canada Gazette 17 May 2005) from the Canadian Government in 2005.

Filmography

Film

Television
 Action Man - additional voices
 Beast Machines - voice of Diagnostic Drone
 Captain N: The Game Master - additional voices
 Class of the Titans - voice of Zeus
 The Fearless Four - Narrator 
 Hero: 108 - Fox King
 Kid vs. Kat - voice of Mr. Cheeks
 The Little Prince - voice of The Aviator (in The New Mission part 3)
 Los Luchadores - Rupert ("Anxiety Attacks")
 MacGyver - Phil Sternwise (Episode: The Visitor)
 Madeline - narrator
 Milo's Bug Quest - narrator
 My Little Pony: Friendship is Magic - voice of Seaspray
 Ninja Turtles: The Next Mutation - voice of Dragon Lord
 Pocket Dragon Adventures - voice of The Wizard
 ReBoot - voice of Hue Branch (in Firewall)
 Sabrina's Secret Life - additional voices
 Spider-Man Unlimited - voice of Bromley
 Stargate SG-1 - Tevaris (Episode: "The Shroud")

Video Games
 Marvel Nemesis: Rise of the Imperfects - voice of Magneto

References

External links

 Interview with THECOMMENTARY.CA

1952 births
Living people
Male actors from Surrey
Male actors from Vancouver
20th-century English male actors
21st-century English male actors
20th-century Canadian male actors
21st-century Canadian male actors
English male voice actors
Canadian male voice actors
Canadian male stage actors
English male stage actors
English emigrants to Canada
Actors from Guildford
Alumni of Bristol Old Vic Theatre School
Members of the Order of British Columbia
Studio 58 people
Canadian artistic directors